Luís Silva (born 3 May 1972) is a Portuguese fencer. He competed in the individual sabre event at the 1992 Summer Olympics.

References

External links
 

1972 births
Living people
Portuguese male sabre fencers
Olympic fencers of Portugal
Fencers at the 1992 Summer Olympics